Peder Per Veggum (11 April 1768 – 15 April 1836) was a Norwegian artist associated with the decorative folk art of Rosemaling. He was primarily known as a skilled and prolific rose painter (norsk rosemaler), but he was also a cabinet carpenter and woodcarver.

Veggum was born at Nord-Fron in Oppland, Norway.  He was the son of Ole Olsen Leine (1726-1801) and Lisbet Nilsdatter Bjorge (1736-1813). He grew up in Vågå and apprenticed at Roros in Sør-Trøndelag. From 1797 he settled at Sel in the traditional region of Gudbrandsdal, where he practiced cabinetmaking, wood carvings and floral paintings. He made and decorated cabinets, pantry, chests, and boxes.

References

Related reading
Blanck, Helen Elizabeth (1975) Rosemaling: the beautiful Norwegian art (Saint Paul, MN: Woodland Park Fine Arts) 
Edwards, Sybil (1994) Decorative folk art: exciting techniques to transform everyday objects (London: David & Charles) 
Miller, Margaret M.; Sigmund Aarseth (1974) Norwegian rosemaling : decorative painting on wood (New York City: Scribners) 
Ellingsgard, Nils (1999) Norsk rosemåling – Dekorativ måling i folkekunsten (Oslo, Det norske samlaget)

External links
Rosemåling  Historikk

1768 births
1836 deaths
People from Nord-Fron
18th-century Norwegian painters
18th-century male artists
19th-century Norwegian painters
Norwegian male painters
19th-century Norwegian male artists